James P. Dugan (July 4, 1929 – December 12, 2021) was an American lawyer and politician in the Democratic Party who served in the New Jersey State Senate and as chairman of the New Jersey Democratic State Committee.

Born and raised in Bayonne, New Jersey, Dugan attended St. Peter's Preparatory School, which he described in an interview as "the best learning experience I ever had". 

Dugan served in the Korean War as a captain in the United States Marine Corps. After the war he studied at Fordham University School of Law, receiving a J.D. degree in 1957. He was admitted to the New York Bar in 1957 and the New Jersey Bar in 1959.

He was elected to the New Jersey State Senate in 1969, serving for eight years. In 1973 he was named chairman of the Senate Judiciary Committee. Also in that year he was selected as chairman of the New Jersey Democratic State Committee and helped nominate Brendan Byrne for Governor of New Jersey, though he would later become a critic of Byrne. Dugan stepped down from the party chairmanship in 1977 and also lost his Senate seat that year in a primary challenge.

Dugan joined the New Jersey law firm Waters, McPherson, McNeill in 1994. He had resided in Bayonne and Saddle River.

Dugan died on December 12, 2021, at the age of 92.

References

External links
Biographical information for James P. Dugan from The Political Graveyard

|-

|-

|-

1929 births
2021 deaths
Politicians from Bayonne, New Jersey
Politicians from Bergen County, New Jersey
People from Saddle River, New Jersey
Military personnel from New Jersey
Democratic Party New Jersey state senators
New Jersey lawyers
St. Peter's Preparatory School alumni
Fordham University School of Law alumni
Chairmen of the New Jersey Democratic State Committee
American military personnel of the Korean War
United States Marine Corps officers
20th-century American politicians
20th-century American lawyers